Korabina  is a village in the administrative district of Gmina Bojanów, within Stalowa Wola County, Subcarpathian Voivodeship, in south-eastern Poland.

References

Korabina